The Heywood-Wakefield Company is an American furniture manufacturer established in 1897. It went on to become a major presence in the US. Its older products are considered collectibles and have been featured on Antiques Roadshow.

History
Heywood Brothers was established in 1826, Wakefield Company in 1855. Both firms produced wicker and rattan furniture, and as these products became increasingly popular towards the end of the century, they became serious rivals. In 1897 the companies merged as Heywood Brothers & Wakefield Company (this name was changed to Heywood-Wakefield Company in 1921), purchasing Washburn-Heywood Chair Company in 1916, Oregon Chair Company in 1920, and Lloyd Manufacturing Company in 1921.

While its wooden furniture plant in Gardner, Massachusetts closed in 1979, a branch in Menominee, Michigan continued to manufacture metal outdoor seats, auditorium seats, and school furniture. The Heywood-Wakefield Company Complex in Gardner was added to the National Historic Register in 1983. The South Beach Furniture Company acquired the rights to the name in 1994 and reproduces its wooden furniture.

Products
Both founding companies produced wicker and rattan furniture in the late 19th century. Wakefield initiated its mechanized production. The wicker styles drew on the Aesthetic Movement and Japanese influences; simpler designs arose in the wake of the Arts and Crafts Movement. The merged entity stayed abreast of wicker furniture trends by hiring designers such as Paul Frankl and Donald Deskey during the 1920s. Its furniture was exhibited at the 1933 Century of Progress exhibition and at the 1964 New York World's Fair.

During the 1930s and 1940s Heywood-Wakefield began producing furniture using sleek designs based on French Art Deco.
 
Long-haul bus companies began focusing on passenger comfort in the 1920s. Their bucket seats proved successful and rail companies began to follow suit. The Association of American Railroads' Mechanical Division and Heywood-Wakefield became involved in the quest for more luxurious seat design. Through a grant from Heywood-Wakefield, the Association employed a Harvard professor of anthropology, E. A. Hooton, to research rail passenger seat preferences in 1945. Heywood-Wakefield's resulting Sleepy Hollow seat came into wide use.

References

External links
 

Furniture companies of the United States
Gardner, Massachusetts